Oregon Route 413 (OR 413) is an Oregon state highway running from Cornucopia to Halfway. OR 413 is known as the Halfway-Cornucopia Highway No. 413 (see Oregon highways and routes).

OR 413 was established in 2003 as part of Oregon's project to assign route numbers to highways that previously were not assigned, and, as of July 2017, was unsigned.

Route description 

OR 413 begins at Elk Creek in Cornucopia and heads southeast through Carson and Jimtown to Halfway, where it ends at an intersection with OR 414 and OR 86 Spur.  Its northernmost  are unpaved and narrow, and is closed by snow in the winter.

History 

The Halfway-Cornucopia Highway was established in 1935 with the division of the old Baker-Cornucopia Highway into the Baker-Halfway Highway No. 12 and the Halfway-Cornucopia Highway.  OR 413 was assigned to the Halfway-Cornucopia Highway in 2003.

Major intersections

References 
 Oregon Department of Transportation, Descriptions of US and Oregon Routes, https://web.archive.org/web/20051102084300/http://www.oregon.gov/ODOT/HWY/TRAFFIC/TEOS_Publications/PDF/Descriptions_of_US_and_Oregon_Routes.pdf, page 31.
 Oregon Department of Transportation, Halfway-Cornucopia Highway No. 413, ftp://ftp.odot.state.or.us/tdb/trandata/maps/slchart_pdfs_1980_to_2002/Hwy413_1996.pdf
 Oregon Highways, Baker City-Copperfield Highway #12 (Archive), https://web.archive.org/web/20050206182806/http://www.ylekot.com/orehwys/hwy-12.html

413
Transportation in Baker County, Oregon